Physic may refer to:
 The study or practice of medicine
 A substance administered as medicine, or the medicinal plant from which it is extracted:
 Gillenia stipulata, a plant known commonly as Indian physic
 Jatropha, a genus of plants commonly known as the physic nut
 Veronicastrum virginicum, a plant known commonly as Culver's physic
 Physic garden, a type of herb garden with medicinal plants

See also
 Physics (disambiguation)
 Regius Professor of Physic (disambiguation)
 Regius Professor of Medicine (disambiguation)